"The Galileo Seven" is the sixteenth episode of the first season of the American science fiction television series Star Trek. Written by Oliver Crawford and directed by Robert Gist, it first aired on January 5, 1967.

In the episode, First Officer Spock leads a scientific team from the Enterprise aboard the shuttlecraft Galileo on an ill-fated mission, facing him with tough decisions when the shuttle crashes on a planet populated by aggressive giants.

Inspired by the film Five Came Back, it featured the debut of the shuttlecraft.

Plot
The USS Enterprise, under the command of Captain Kirk, is en route to Markus III to deliver medical supplies destined for the New Paris Colony. The ship passes close to a quasar-like formation identified as Murasaki 312, which Kirk's standing orders require him to study. Kirk sends a science team composed of Science Officer Spock, Chief Medical Officer Dr. McCoy, Chief Engineer Scott, Yeoman Mears, and three other specialists (Latimer, Gaetano, and Boma) in the shuttlecraft, Galileo, to investigate the formation. Soon after launch, the shuttle is pulled off course. Spock makes an emergency landing on the planet Taurus II, a rocky, fog-shrouded world in the middle of the Murasaki phenomenon.

Crewmembers Latimer and Gaetano scout the area, eventually encountering Taurus II's native inhabitants: giant ape-like creatures armed with enormous spears and shields. Latimer is killed by a spear, and Gaetano drives off the creatures with phaser fire. The crew retreat to the Galileo, only to discover that the creatures seem to be preparing for an organized attack. Despite objections from the others, Spock chooses to attempt to frighten the creatures rather than killing them outright. This proves to be a miscalculation, and Gaetano is killed.

Meanwhile, Kirk searches for the shuttle, despite concerns from Commissioner Ferris, who is impatient to start for Markus III. Because of sensor interference, the shuttlecraft Columbus is dispatched to search the planet from orbit, and search parties are transported to the surface. One of the landing parties returns with casualties and reports being attacked by the large, furry creatures.

Between boulder-throwing attacks by the primitive giants and quarrels amongst themselves, the crew attempt to make repairs on the shuttle. As most of their conventional fuel has been lost, Mr. Scott adapts the landing party's phasers to power the ship. His repairs are eventually successful, but Boma will not leave without giving Gaetano and Latimer a proper burial. When Spock advises against it, Boma becomes insubordinate, to which Spock responds by allowing him the funeral.  During the ceremony, the creatures attack again, and Spock is pinned by a boulder.  Despite Spock's orders to leave him, McCoy and Boma free him.  Spock then manages to get the Galileo off the ground by using the shuttle's boosters. As a result, the shuttle now has too little fuel to escape the planet's gravity or even to achieve a stable orbit, and there is still no way to contact the Enterprise. Spock suddenly decides to dump and ignite all the remaining fuel from the shuttle's engines. The giant flare he produces is seen on the Enterprise view screen just as the ship has left orbit. Kirk reverses course, and the survivors are beamed out just as the shuttle is destroyed on re-entry.

Back on board the Enterprise, Kirk questions Spock, trying to get him to admit that his final action was motivated more by emotion than logic. Spock refuses but freely admits to stubbornness, at which the rest of the crew burst into laughter.

Reception
Zack Handlen of The A.V. Club gave the episode a 'B' rating, noting that it "raises some interesting issues" but described it overall as watching a "fixed fight". The Hollywood Reporter ranked "The Galileo Seven" as the 67th greatest Star Trek franchise episode in 2016, including episodes in later series. They also ranked this episode as the 19th best episode of the original series. In 2016, Business Insider ranked "The Galileo Seven" the 9th best episode of the original series.

Io9's 2014 listing of the top 100 Star Trek episodes placed "The Galileo Seven" as the 36th best episode of all series up to that time, out of over 700 episodes.

In 2015, SyFy ranked this episode as one of the top ten essential Star Trek original series Spock episodes.

In 2017, Business Insider ranked "The Galileo Seven" the 9th best episode of the original series. They note this is the first Star Trek episode to include a shuttlecraft.

In 2018, Collider ranked this episode the 15th best original series episode.

In 2018, PopMatters ranked this the 17th best episode of the original series.

A 2018 Star Trek binge-watching guide by Den of Geek, recommended this episode for featuring the trio of characters Kirk, Spock, and Bones of the original series.

References

External links

 "The Galileo Seven" Screenshots before and after remastering at TrekMovie.com

Star Trek: The Original Series (season 1) episodes
1967 American television episodes
Television episodes written by Oliver Crawford